Route 88 was a  state highway located entirely within the city limits of Springfield. Its western terminus was at Sunshine Street (formerly US 60/US 160, now designated as Route 413). Its eastern terminus was at Glenstone Avenue (Business Loop 44 and also formerly designated as US 65 Business). It was a collection of older highways (mainly business routes) which were still under state maintenance.

Route description
From the intersection of Sunshine Street and Scenic Avenue, it went north on Scenic to Scenic's northern terminus at Chestnut Expressway, east on Chestnut Expressway, then north on Kansas Expressway, then briefly east on Division Street and then followed Commercial Street to Glenstone.

Major intersections

See also

References

088 1960s